is a Japanese singer and tarento. In 2011, the Japanese music television program Music Station listed her as the 50th all-time best-selling idol in Japan, with 2,850,000 records sold.

Childhood and education
Hayami was born in Atami, Shizuoka, and was raised in Guam and Hawaii from the age of 3 to 14 years old. She was scouted by an agent at the age of 14 and soon moved back to Japan to start her career as a singer. After graduating from Horikoshi High School in 1986, she entered Sophia University and graduated, receiving a bachelor's degree in Comparative Culture.

Musical career
In 1982, Hayami gained her J-pop singer's debut with the single "Isoide Hatsukoi" (ASAP, my first love!) after being scouted by a talent agent in a shopping mall's elevator in Hawaii in 1980 when she was only 14 years old. Named “Bilingual girl back from Hawaii” due to her ability to speak very fluent English because of her background, Hayami was instantly recognised and touted as one of the best newcomers to watch out for. She proceeded to win most of the major newcomers’ awards by end of 1982.

In 1983, her fifth single, "Natsu Iro no Nancy" (Summer Coloured Nancy), was selected as a campaign song for a Coca-Cola commercial, and she became a cover girl of that. The single became Hayami's first Big Hit, making it to the top 10 of the Oricon Chart, winning countless awards. As a result of the success of the song, Hayami made her 1st appearance at the 34th edition of the year end NHK Kouhaku Red and White Song Festival. Hayami participated consecutively 3 years in the prestigious show. (1983 - 1985)

In 1985, in order to shed off her "teen idol" image, Hayami began releasing euro beat dance music, and was well received.

In the early 1990s, when her pop music career began to decline, Hayami shifted her focus to become an actress and TV & Radio presenter. Being able to speak fluent English, Hayami's host programmes were all catered to English speaking education materials and were all very popular. Hayami continued her successful presenter's work till current, and can still be regularly seen on entertainment varieties programme singing her signature songs from the early stage of her idol career.

Film career
She gained the first role in the 1982 film Santō Kōkōsei. Up till 2008, Hayami has appeared in 13 movies, including one produced and filmed entirely in Hong Kong in 1987.

Recent activities 
Aside from releasing numerous hit singles and albums, Hayami has been very active in theater and in TV and films as well.

1988 Musical, “Grease” played Sandy

1989-1994 Musical “The Wizard of Oz” played Dorothy

1996 Musical “My Last Love”

1996 Musical “Daddy Long Legs”

1997-1999 Les Misérables played Cosette

2011 Musical “Heroine” played Nana

2019 Musical “Annie” played Ms. Hannigan

In 2008, she starred as the Captain General in the Tokusatsu series Tomica Hero: Rescue Force.

Hayami is a co-host alongside Master Chef Tatsuo Saito on the NHK program Dining with the Chef, which airs internationally on NHK World. Together, they present the basics and importance of Japanese cuisine.

Personal life
Hayami was married to Tomio Fukuda in 1996, and has two daughters.

Discography

Albums
[1982.06.21] AND I LOVE YOU
[1982.11.21] Image
[1983.05.01] LANAI
[1983.08.21] DEAR
[1983.11.21] COLORFUL BOX
[1984.03.01] Recess (リーセス)
[1984.09.02] Sincerely (シンシアリー)
[1984.12.01] Music (ミュージック)
[1985.05.01] WOW!
[1985.06.21] Exciting You '85 Stand Up
[1985.08.31] Kids (キッズ)
[1985.11.30] Twin (ツイン)
[1986.02.01] YŪ
[1986.05.22] Burning Illusion (バーニングイリュージョン)
[1986.11.29] Shadows of the Night (シャドゥズ・オブ・ザ・ナイト)
[1987.08.05] GET DOWN!
[1988.03.25] WHO'S GONNA COME?
[1988.12.04] MOMENTS
[1992.12.16] Hayami no American Kids

Singles
[1982.04.02] Isoide! Hatsukoi (急いで!初恋)
[1982.07.21] Love Light
[1982.10.19] Answer Song wa Aishuu (アンサーソングは哀愁)
[1983.01.21] Ano Kei ni Mou Ichido (あの頃にもう一度)
[1983.04.01] Natsuiro no Nancy (夏色のナンシー)
[1983.07.01] Nagisa no Lion (渚のライオン)
[1983.09.21] Lucky Lips (ラッキィ・リップス)
[1983.12.21] Daite My Love (抱いてマイ・ラブ)
[1984.03.31] Yuuwaku Kousen Kuraa! (誘惑光線・クラッ!)
[1984.08.01] Me☆Sailor Man (Me☆セーラーマン)
[1984.10.03] Aishuu Jyouku (哀愁情句)
[1985.02.01] TONIGHT
[1985.05.22] STAND UP
[1985.08.01] PASSION
[1985.11.21] CLASH
[1986.03.20] Seireki 1986 (西暦1986)
[1986.07.16] NEWS ni Naranai Koi (NEWSにならない恋)
[1986.10.22] LOVE STATION
[1987.03.21] Heart wa Modoranai (ハートは戻らない)
[1987.06.21] Heart wa Modoranai (12 Inch) (ハートは戻らない(12インチ))
[1987.07.05] CARIBBEAN NIGHT
[1987.09.05] TOKIO EXPRESS
[1987.11.28] LONELY LIAR
[1988.03.25] GET UP
[1988.11.26] YESTERDAY DREAMER
[1989.05.10] BEAT LOVER
[1989.09.06] Yuubae no Naka de (夕映えの中で)
[1991.11.06] Heaven ni Yoroshiku (ヘップバーンによろしく)
[1992.04.08] Hohoemi Aeru (ほほ笑みあえる)
[1995.06.07] CHANCE
[2016.08.25] Delicacy Of Love

Compilation Albums & Extended Plays
[1983.08.21] "Dear" (EP)
[1984.11.01] You Best
[1984.09.02] Sincerely (EP)
[1985.09.28] You Best '85
[1986.02.01] YŪ
[1986.12.20] YU "SINGLE A" BEST COLLECTION
[1987.11.28] YŪ's BEAT
[1989.04.08] YŪ's BEST
[1989.12.06] YŪ's GOODS
[1990.03.07] SINCE 1982 ~MAIDEN VOYAGE~ Best of Yu
[1995.11.25] Yu "Single A" Best Collection
[2002.10.17] 82-85 BOKURA NO BEST YU HAYAMI CD-BOX
[2003.11.26] GOLDEN☆BEST YU HAYAMI 筒美京平POPSベスト
[2007.01.17] Idol Revival Greatest Hits Yu Hayami
[2012.03.28] Thank YU ~30th Anniversary Single Best~
[2012.04.18] Thank YU ~30th Anniversary Special Box~
[2014.03.28] Golden Idol Yu Hayami

References

External links 
Yu Hayami Official website

1966 births
Living people
20th-century Japanese actresses
20th-century Japanese women singers
20th-century Japanese singers
21st-century Japanese actresses
Actors from Shizuoka Prefecture
American School in Japan alumni
Horikoshi High School alumni
Japanese film actresses
Japanese television actresses
Japanese women pop singers
Musicians from Shizuoka Prefecture
Sophia University alumni
Universal Music Japan artists